The Memphis Express was a professional American football franchise based in Memphis, Tennessee. It was a member of the Alliance of American Football (AAF) during its single season in 2019. They played their home games at Liberty Bowl Memorial Stadium, and were coached by former NFL player and head coach Mike Singletary.

On April 2, 2019, the league's football operations were reportedly suspended, and on April 4 the league allowed players to leave their contracts to sign with NFL teams.

History
The Alliance of American Football announced the awarding of the third inaugural league team, Alliance Memphis, on May 4, 2018. This announcement was followed by the May 10, 2018, announcement of Mike Singletary as the team's head coach.

On July 30, 2018, the Alliance announced team Memphis had signed its first 29 players. On September 20, the league announced four eastern inaugural franchises' names and logos including Memphis as the Memphis Express. The name is derived from Memphis' significance as a mail and cargo transport city being the "World Headquarters" of FedEx (formerly Federal Express), with an airplane being featured in the logo. (FedEx CEO Frederick W. Smith had previously owned the Memphis Mad Dogs pro football team in the 1990s; as the AAF was a single-entity league that never progressed to selling individual franchises as originally planned, Smith had no involvement or investment with the Express, despite the use of the Express name and imagery.)

On January 5, 2019, training camp opened in San Antonio, Texas. The final 52-man roster was released on January 30. The Express' inaugural game, played against the Birmingham Iron at Legion Field on February 10, ended in a 26–0 shutout loss. Their first home game was a 20–18 loss against the Arizona Hotshots during week 2. Memphis notched their first win on March 2, with a 26–23 victory  over the San Diego Fleet at Liberty Bowl Memorial Stadium.

On March 16, 2019, shortly after the Express fell to 1–5 in a 22–9 loss to the Salt Lake Stallions, the team announced they had signed Heisman Trophy winning quarterback Johnny Manziel.

On April 2, 2019, the league's football operations were suspended, and on April 4 the league allowed players to leave their contracts to sign with NFL teams. On April 17, 2019, the league announced the cessation of business operations after filing for Chapter 7 bankruptcy.

Final Roster

Allocation pool
The Express' assigned area, which designated player rights, included the following colleges:

Colleges
 Arkansas
 Austin Peay
 Carson–Newman
 Chattanooga
 East Tennessee State
 Kentucky
 Lane College
 LSU

 Memphis
 Middle Tennessee
 Ole Miss
 Tennessee
 Tennessee State
 Tennessee Tech
 Tusculum
 UT Martin
 Vanderbilt

National Football League (NFL)
 Cincinnati Bengals
 Indianapolis Colts
 New Orleans Saints
 Tennessee Titans

Canadian Football League (CFL)
 Winnipeg Blue Bombers

Staff

Notable Players

Former Notable Players 
 Christian Hackenberg - Former New York Jets Quarterback, 2016 2nd Round Pick
 Johnny Manziel - 2012 Heisman Trophy Winner, Former Cleveland Browns Quarterback, 2014 1st Round Pick
 Zach Mettenberger - Former Tennessee Titans Quarterback
 Zac Stacy - Former St. Louis Rams Running Back

2019 season

Final standings

Schedule

Preseason

Regular season
All times Central

 Changed from original time and/or network.

Game summaries

Week 1: at Birmingham

Week 2: Arizona

Week 3: at Orlando

Week 4: San Diego

Week 5: at Atlanta

Week 6: at Salt Lake

Week 7: Birmingham

This was the first overtime game in AAF history. Despite newly signed quarterback Johnny Manziel playing a few series for the Express, starter Brandon Silvers led the team to a comeback victory, keeping its slim postseason chances alive.

Week 8: Orlando

Media
In addition to league-wide television coverage through NFL Network, CBS Sports Network, TNT, and B/R Live, Memphis' games were also broadcast on local radio by KWNW, an iHeartMedia station branded as 101.9 Kiss FM.

References

Further reading
 

 
2018 establishments in Tennessee
2019 disestablishments in Tennessee